Village Park Historic District is a historic district in Canton, New York.

It was listed on the National Register of Historic Places in 1975, and its boundaries were twice increased, in 1983 and in 2008.

References

Historic districts on the National Register of Historic Places in New York (state)
Historic districts in St. Lawrence County, New York
National Register of Historic Places in St. Lawrence County, New York